Bembidion rapidum is a species of ground beetle in the subfamily Trechinae. It is found in Canada and the United States.

References

External links

 

rapidum
Beetles described in 1847
Beetles of North America
Taxa named by John Lawrence LeConte